Damal Krishnaswamy Jayaraman (popularly known as DKJ), the renowned brother of D. K. Pattammal, was a professional Carnatic music singer. He was awarded the Madras Music Academy's Sangeetha Kalanidhi in 1990.

After learning music from his sister, he furthered his musical skills under many known masters in the field, including Muthiah Bhagavathar and Papanasam Sivan. Like his sister, Jayaraman was known for his moving krithi renditions, especially of Muthuswami Dikshitar's compositions. Jayaraman also sang Tamil songs such as those of Papanasam Sivan.

Early life and background

Born on 22 July 1928, to Damal Krishnaswamy Dikshitar and Rajammal in Kanchipuram, popularly and affectionately known as DKJ, was the brother of the music queen D.K. Pattammal. DKJ inherited his perfect diction, interest and aptitude for Tamil songs from his father who was proficient in Tamil literature.

DKJ’s first formal guru was his own sister Sangeetha Kalanidhi D.K. Pattammal to whom, he declares, he owes everything. But having a keen mind, he absorbed a lot by just listening to Vidwans like Ambi Dikshitar, N.S. Krishnaswamy Iyengar (disciple of Kanchipuram Naina Pillai), Koteeswara Iyer, Flute Venkatarama Iyer, T. L. Venkatarama Iyer and Papanasam Sivan, when they came home to coach Pattammal. DKJ was perpetually thirsty for knowledge. He once pestered DKP to write down the words of Balagopala kriti for him. Where other children cherished their wooden toys or rocking horses, DKJ’s prized possession was that bit of paper containing the great piece. He mastered the kriti overnight and rendered it perfectly the next day to an astonished but appreciative DKP. Small wonder then, that DKP fostered her younger brother‘s musical talent right from a tender age.

Some of his popular disciples include Smt Rama Ravi (Ramaa Ravi), Vijay Siva, R. K. Shriramkumar, Balaji Shankar, Dr. S.Sunder, Asha Ramesh, T G Badrinarayanan, Sharada Mani, and his daughter Sukanya Jayaraman.

His son J. Vaidhyanathan is an eminent Mridangam player.

References

Male Carnatic singers
Carnatic singers
1928 births
1991 deaths
20th-century Indian male classical singers
Sangeetha Kalanidhi recipients
Singers from Tamil Nadu
Recipients of the Sangeet Natak Akademi Award